GWF may refer to:
 
 George Weston Foods, an Australian food products company
 German Wrestling Federation, a German professional wrestling promotion
 Global Water Foundation
 Global Wrestling Federation, an American professional wrestling promotion
 Gnaraloo Wilderness Foundation
 Gothaer Waggonfabrik, a defunct German aircraft and rolling stock manufacturer
 Gowro language, native to Pakistan
 Guild Wars Factions, a video game